The Wellingborough by-election of 4 December 1969 was held following the death of Labour Member of Parliament (MP) Harry Howarth earlier that year. The seat was won by the Conservative Party.

Results

References

1969 elections in the United Kingdom
1969 in England
1960s in Northamptonshire
By-elections to the Parliament of the United Kingdom in Northamptonshire constituencies
Wellingborough